John Stack (1845 – 5 March 1897) was an Irish nationalist politician, and Member of Parliament (MP) for North Kerry from 1885 to 1892.

At the 1885 general election, Stack was elected unopposed as Irish Parliamentary Party MP for the newly created North Kerry constituency; it was the only one of the four Kerry constituencies not be contested by a Conservative or Loyalist candidate. He was returned unopposed in 1886, and when the Irish Party split in 1891, he sided with the Anti-Parnellite majority, joining the Irish National Federation. Stack did not contest the 1892 general election, when the Anti-Parnellite Thomas Sexton won the seat with a large majority over a Parnellite candidate.

References

External links 
 

1845 births
1897 deaths
Members of the Parliament of the United Kingdom for County Kerry constituencies (1801–1922)
UK MPs 1885–1886
UK MPs 1886–1892
Irish Parliamentary Party MPs
Anti-Parnellite MPs